Washington's Crossing is the location of George Washington's crossing of the Delaware River on the night of December 25–26, 1776 in the American Revolutionary War.  This daring maneuver led to victory in the Battle of Trenton and altered the course of the war.  The site, a National Historic Landmark, is composed of state parks in Washington Crossing, New Jersey, and Washington Crossing, Pennsylvania, north of Trenton, New Jersey.

Description and history
The Washington's Crossing site is located north of Yardley, Pennsylvania and Trenton, New Jersey.  The main commemorative sites are located north of the Washington Crossing Bridge spanning the river.

Pennsylvania side

Washington Crossing Historic Park encapsulates the crossing site on the Pennsylvania side. A memorial marker indicates the site of the crossing.

New Jersey side

Washington Crossing State Park includes the New Jersey side of the crossing site.  It is at over  much larger than the Pennsylvania park, including a broader array of recreational amenities, including a visitors center, nature center, astronomical observatory, campground, and open-air theater.  Elements specifically relating to the crossing including the Johnson Ferry House and a stretch of the original roadway traversed by the army.

See also

 List of National Historic Landmarks in New Jersey
 List of National Historic Landmarks in Pennsylvania

References

National Historic Landmarks in New Jersey
National Historic Landmarks in Pennsylvania
Geography of Bucks County, Pennsylvania
National Register of Historic Places in Mercer County, New Jersey
National Register of Historic Places in Bucks County, Pennsylvania
George Washington's crossing of the Delaware River